Dimitar Radev is a Bulgarian economist who since July 14, 2015 has been governor of the Bulgarian National Bank.

Early life and education
Radev was born in Plovdiv and on 12 July 1956. He graduated in Finance and Credit at the University of National and World Economy, and later specialized in Georgetown University's Institute of Foreign Relations, Washington (1994).

Career
In the 1990s, Radev served as a deputy finance minister in charge of budget.

Before his appointment, Radev worked at the International Monetary Fund’s fiscal affairs department.

In a parliamentary selection process including public nominations and hearings, Radev was named one of the candidates to succeed Bulgaria’s central bank governor Ivan Iskrov in 2015, alongside Biser Manolov, Grigorii Vazov and Victor Yotzov. He was nominated by Bulgaria’s ruling GERB party. He was also backed by GERB’s junior partner, the Reformist Bloc. In July 2015, he was appointed for a six-year term.

Other activities
 European Systemic Risk Board (ESRB), Ex-Officio Member of the General Board
 International Monetary Fund (IMF), Ex-Officio Member of the Board of Governors

References

Living people
1956 births
Governors of the Bulgarian National Bank
University of National and World Economy alumni
20th-century Bulgarian economists
21st-century Bulgarian economists
People from Plovdiv